John Pearce may refer to:

 John Jamison Pearce (1826–1912), U.S. Representative from Pennsylvania
 John Pearce (actor) (1927–2000), American actor
 John Pearce (American football) (born 1947), American football coach, head football coach at Stephen F. Austin State University (1992–1998)
 John Pearce (boxer) (born 1971), English Olympic boxer
 John Pearce (entertainer) (born 1991), member of the Australian pop group Justice Crew and The Wiggles
 John Pearce (equestrian) (born 1960), Canadian Olympic equestrian
 John Pearce (handballer) (born 1987), British handball player
 John Pearce (tennis) (1923–1992), Australian tennis player
 John A. Pearce (born 1969), associate justice of the Utah Supreme Court
 John Bond Pearce (1843–1903), architect in Norwich, England
 John Pearce (footballer) (1940–2022), English footballer

See also
 John Pierce (disambiguation)